Ernest Vernon Carter (July 27, 1925 – October 16, 2010) was an American politician. He served as a member of the South Carolina House of Representatives.

Life and career 
Carter was born in DeLand, Florida. He served in the United States Army during World War II.

In 1967, Carter was elected to the South Carolina House of Representatives, representing Williamsburg County, South Carolina.

Carter died in October 2010 at his son's home in Hamlet, North Carolina, at the age of 85.

References 

1925 births
2010 deaths
People from DeLand, Florida
Members of the South Carolina House of Representatives
20th-century American politicians